Élisabeth Moreno (born 20 September 1970) is a French-Cape Verdean businesswoman and politician who served as Minister Delegate for Gender Equality, Diversity and Equal Opportunities at the Prime Minister's Office in the government of Prime Minister Jean Castex from 2020 to 2022.

Early life and career 
Moreno moved from Cape Verde to France with her family in the late 1970s, in order for them to access medical infrastructure to treat Moreno's younger sister for burns. Her career has included growing a company in the construction sector that she created with her husband, four years at France Telecom, and later at Dell. In 2006 she obtained an Executive MBA from ESSEC Business School and the University of Mannheim.

Before entering politics, Moreno worked as vice-president and managing director of Hewlett-Packard for Africa from 2019 until 2020, based in South Africa, and as president of Lenovo France from 2017 until 2019.

Political career 
Under Moreno's leadership, the French government successfully introduced a bill intended to protect victims of domestic violence, allowing doctors to break patient confidentiality if they believe a life is "in immediate danger".

In January 2022, Moreno and Agnès Pannier-Runacher jointly published a book on feminism.

In the 2022 French legislative election, she contested the 9th constituency for French residents overseas but was narrowly beaten by Karim Ben Cheïkh from Génération.s (NUPES) in the second round.

See also
 Castex Government

References 

1970 births
Living people
Government ministers of France
Women's ministers
Women government ministers of France
Cape Verdean women in politics
French people of Cape Verdean descent
French women's rights activists
French chief executives
French women chief executives
Chief executives in the technology industry
ESSEC Business School alumni
University of Mannheim alumni
21st-century French politicians
21st-century French women politicians
Candidates for the 2022 French legislative election
Black French politicians